Tyler Mark Reid (born 2 September 1997) is an English professional footballer who plays as a right back for Finnish club VPS.

Career
Born in Luton, Reid was a product of the Arsenal youth system, before joining the Manchester United  academy in 2012 at the age of 14. Reid signed for Swansea City in July 2016. He moved on loan to Newport County in January 2018.

Reid made his senior debut in a Football League game against Grimsby Town on 13 January 2018. He appeared as a second-half substitute on 13 January 2018 in a 2–1 win.

In June 2019 he moved to Swindon Town.

He signed for Wrexham on loan on 21 November 2019.

On 2 October 2020 Reid left Swindon Town by mutual consent. Later that day he signed for National League club Woking.

On 12 February 2021, Reid joined Finnish club Jaro on a one-year deal. He has also featured for the club's sister club JBK.

On 7 February 2022, Reid signed a two-year contract with VPS, also in Finland.

Personal life
His brother Jayden is also a footballer, previously with Swansea City's academy but who signed for Birmingham City's academy in July 2019.

Career statistics

References

1997 births
Living people
English footballers
Arsenal F.C. players
Manchester United F.C. players
Swansea City A.F.C. players
Newport County A.F.C. players
Swindon Town F.C. players
Wrexham A.F.C. players
Woking F.C. players
English Football League players
Association football fullbacks
National League (English football) players
English expatriate footballers
English expatriate sportspeople in Finland
Expatriate footballers in Finland
FF Jaro players
Ykkönen players
Jakobstads BK players
Kakkonen players
Vaasan Palloseura players
Veikkausliiga players